Joe Grant (May 15, 1908 – May 7, 2005) was an American artist and writer.

Biography 
Born in New York City, Grant worked for Walt Disney Animation Studios as a character designer and story artist beginning in 1932 on the Mickey Mouse short, Parade Of The Nominees (a cartoon never theatrically released but instead made for the Academy Awards). He designed Queen Grimhilde in Snow White and the Seven Dwarfs. He led the development of Pinocchio and co-wrote Fantasia, Dumbo and Saludos Amigos. During World War II, Grant worked on war cartoons including the Oscar-winning Der Fuehrer's Face.

Grant was Jewish, and rigorously denied rumors that Walt Disney was anti-Semitic, claiming, "As far as I'm concerned, there was no evidence of anti-Semitism...I think the whole idea should be put to rest and buried deep. He was not anti-Semitic. Some of the most influential people at the Studio were Jewish. It's much ado about nothing. I never once had a problem with him in that way. That myth should be laid to rest."

Lady, the protagonist from Lady and the Tramp, was based on a pet English Springer Spaniel of the same name kept by Grant; in a 2005 documentary on the making of the film, Grant's daughter noted that Walt Disney thought the dog's long fur looked like a dress and suggested creating a storyboard featuring his dog.

Grant left the Disney studio in 1949 and ran a ceramics business and a greeting card business, but returned in 1989 to work on Beauty and the Beast. He also worked on Aladdin, The Lion King, Pocahontas, Mulan, Fantasia 2000, and Pixar's Monsters, Inc. among others. Grant was also specially mentioned in the credits of Monsters, Inc.  The last two films he worked on before his death, Chicken Little and Pixar's Up, were dedicated to him.

Grant worked four days a week at Disney until his death.

He was a recipient of the Disney legend award.

Lorenzo 
In 2004, a short film he developed called Lorenzo was made and was based on his cat who got into a fight with two poodles in 1949. While it happened, he was thinking, "what would happen if he lost his tail?" The short, directed by Mike Gabriel, was released on March 4, 2004, at the Florida Film Festival and made its world premier in front of the critically panned Raising Helen, with this the only positive feedback from critics and audiences. The finished short was planned at the time to be attached for a planned third Fantasia movie, but in 2003, the planned feature was eventually cancelled due to several years of funding and staff cutbacks from Walt Disney Feature Animation. The short won an Annie Award for Best Animated Short Subject, and was included at the Animation Show of Shows.

Death 

On May 6, 2005, Grant died of a heart attack while working at his drawing board in his home studio, nine days before his 97th birthday. He is interred in the Forest Lawn Memorial Park Cemetery in Glendale, California. Chicken Little, released six months after his death, along with Pixar's  Up, released 4 years after his death, were dedicated to his memory.

References

Further reading

External links 

Obituary
Another obituary
Lorenzo Director / Production designer Mike Gabriel uses sequences of production art to discuss the creative process on Lorenzo, a Disney short based on story ideas and sketches by Joe Grant.

1908 births
Animation screenwriters
2005 deaths
Jewish American artists
Artists from New York City
Walt Disney Animation Studios people
Burials at Forest Lawn Memorial Park (Glendale)
Animators from New York (state)
American storyboard artists
American caricaturists
20th-century screenwriters